Geoffrey V (24 August 1113 – 7 September 1151), called the Handsome, the Fair or Plantagenet, was the count of Anjou, Touraine and Maine by inheritance from 1129, and also Duke of Normandy by conquest from 1144. His marriage to Empress Matilda, daughter of King Henry I of England, led to the centuries-long reign of the Plantagenet dynasty in England. The name "Plantagenet" was taken from Geoffrey's epithet.  Geoffrey's ancestral domain of Anjou gave rise to the name Angevin, and what modern historians name as the Angevin Empire in the 12th century.

Early life
Geoffrey was the elder son of Fulk V of Anjou and Ermengarde of Maine. Geoffrey received his nickname from the yellow sprig of broom blossom (genêt is the French name for the planta genista, or broom shrub) he wore in his hat.  The chronicler John of Marmoutier described Geoffrey as handsome, red haired, jovial, and a great warrior. King Henry I of England, having heard reports on Geoffrey's talents and prowess, sent legates to Anjou to negotiate a marriage between his 25-year-old daughter Matilda and Geoffrey. Consent was obtained from both parties, and on 10 June 1128 the fifteen-year-old Geoffrey was knighted in Rouen by King Henry, in preparation for the wedding.

Marriage
Geoffrey and Matilda's marriage took place in 1128. The marriage was meant to seal a lasting peace between England, Normandy (an English possession since William I) and Anjou. She was eleven years older than Geoffrey, and very proud of her status as dowager empress (as opposed to being a mere countess), and which she kept for the remainder of her life. Their marriage was a stormy but happy one with frequent long separations; they had three sons Henry, Geoffrey and William.

Count of Anjou
The year after the marriage Geoffrey's father left for Jerusalem (where he was to later become king), leaving Geoffrey behind as count of Anjou.

When his father in law, King Henry I of England, died in 1135, Geoffrey supported Matilda in entering Normandy to claim her inheritance. The border districts submitted to her, but England chose her first cousin Stephen of Blois for its king, and Normandy soon followed suit. The following year, Geoffrey gave Ambrieres, Gorron, and Chatilon-sur-Colmont to Juhel de Mayenne, on condition that he help obtain the inheritance of Geoffrey's wife.

In 1139 Matilda landed in England with 140 knights, where she was besieged at Arundel Castle by King Stephen. In the Anarchy which ensued, Stephen was captured at Lincoln in February 1141, and imprisoned at Bristol. A legatine council of the English church held at Winchester in April 1141 declared Stephen deposed and proclaimed Matilda "Lady of the English".

During 1142 and 1143, Geoffrey secured all of Normandy west and south of the Seine, and, on 14 January 1144, he crossed the Seine and entered Rouen.  He assumed the title of Duke of Normandy in the summer of 1144. In 1144, he founded an Augustine priory at Château-l'Hermitage in Anjou. Geoffrey held the duchy until 1149, when he and Matilda conjointly ceded it to their son, Henry, which cession was formally ratified by King Louis VII of France the following year.

Geoffrey also put down three baronial rebellions in Anjou, in 1129, 1135 and 1145–1151. He was often at odds with his younger brother, Elias, whom he had imprisoned until Elias died in 1151. The threat of rebellion slowed his progress in Normandy, and is one reason he could never intervene in England. Geoffrey died later the same year, aged 38, and Henry took his father's place as head of the Plantagenet ducal house. In 1153, the Treaty of Wallingford stipulated that Stephen should remain King of England for life and that Henry, the son of Geoffrey and Matilda should succeed him, beginning the Plantagenet era in English history.

Death

Geoffrey died suddenly on 7 September 1151. According to John of Marmoutier, Geoffrey was returning from a royal council when he was stricken with fever. He arrived at Château-du-Loir, collapsed on a couch, made bequests of gifts and charities, and died. His wife and sons outlived him. He was buried at St Julien's Cathedral in Le Mans, France, and his son Henry succeeded him as Duke of Normandy.

Children
Geoffrey and Matilda's children were:
Henry II, King of England (1133–1189)
Geoffrey, Count of Nantes (1134–1158)
William, Viscount of Dieppe (1136–1164)

Geoffrey also had illegitimate children by an unknown mistress (or mistresses): Hamelin who married Isabel de Warenne, 4th Countess of Surrey; Emma, who married Dafydd Ab Owain Gwynedd, Prince of North Wales; and Mary, who became a nun and Abbess of Shaftesbury and who may be the poet Marie de France.

Early heraldry

An enamel effigy (funerary plaque) commissioned by his widow to decorate the tomb of Geoffrey of Anjou is one of the earliest examples of European heraldry.  Jean de Marmentier, a late-12th-century chronicler, reported that in 1128 Henry I of England knighted his son-in-law Geoffrey and granted him a badge of gold lions. A gold lion may already have been Henry's own badge, and different lion motifs would later be used by many of his descendants.  The enamel shows Geoffrey with a blue shield depicting gold lions, apparently the same motif later used by a grandson of Geoffrey, William Longespee.  In addition to being one of the first authentic representations of a coat of arms, according to British historian Jim Bradbury it "suggests possible evidence for the early use of what became the English royal arms".

Ancestors

References

|-

|-

|-

1113 births
1151 deaths
12th-century French people
12th-century English people
12th-century Dukes of Normandy
Dukes of Normandy
Counts of Anjou
Counts of Maine
House of Plantagenet
Christians of the Second Crusade
Duchy of Normandy
Empress Matilda
People of The Anarchy
Sons of kings